Zinc pyrophosphate (Zn2P2O7) is an ionic inorganic chemical compound composed of Zn2+ cations and pyrophosphate anions.

Preparation 
Zinc pyrophosphate can be obtained from the thermal decomposition of zinc ammonium phosphate.

2 ZnNH4PO4 → Zn2P2O7 + 2 NH3 + H2O

It can also be obtained from the reaction between sodium carbonate, zinc oxide, and ammonium dihydrogen phosphate.

Na2CO3 + 2 ZnO + 2 (NH4)H2PO4 → Zn2P2O7 + 2 NaOH + 2 NH3 + 2 H2O + CO2

It is also produced when a strongly acidic solution of zinc sulfate is heated with sodium pyrophosphate.

2 ZnSO4 + Na4P2O7 → Zn2P2O7 + 2 Na2SO4

Another method is precipitating zinc as a phosphate, then heating over 1123 K.

Properties 
Zinc pyrophosphate is a white crystalline solid that is insoluble in water. On heating in water, it decomposes to form Zn3(PO4)2 and ZnHPO4. It crystallizes in the monoclinic system. The α-form crystallizes at low temperatures and the β-form crystallizes at high temperatures.

Uses 
Zinc pyrophosphate is used as a pigment. It is useful in gravimetric analysis of zinc.

References

Pyrophosphates
pyrophosphate